Lansdale Catholic High School is a secondary school that is part of the Roman Catholic Archdiocese of Philadelphia. It is located in Lansdale, Pennsylvania, United States.

History
The school opened in September 1949 as Little Flower Catholic High School, after its patron saint, Therese of Lisieux. The first year had only a freshman class in a very small building on the grounds of St. Stanislaus Church in Lansdale.   That building is still functioning on the property of St. Stanislaus, and today is called Little Flower Hall. Each succeeding year, another class/year was added and in 1953, commencement exercises were held for the first graduating class of 33 students.

Probably the main, if not the only, driving force to bring about the establishment of the school was Monsignor Joseph Schade, who was the Pastor of St. Stanislaus at that time. He was aided in his efforts by the willingness of the Sisters of St. Francis of Assisi of Philadelphia who initially staffed the school, with Sister Theresa Clare being the first principal (and one of the teachers).

Although the sports teams had long been referred to as Lansdale Catholic, it was with the opening of the new facility that the name of the school was "officially" changed to Lansdale Catholic High School.

The school continued as a "parish" high school until the mid-1980s when control of the school was taken over by the Archdiocese.

In 1988, there was the dedication of a major addition to the school. It was made possible primarily through the support of the Business Leaders Organized for Catholic Schools.

In more recent years, other improvements were added including another on-site parking facility, baseball field, window replacements, air-conditioning in the gymnasium, reconditioning of the football and lacrosse fields. Over the Summer of 2012, the gymnasium was completely refurbished with new floors and bleachers.

On January 28, 2008, the Roman Catholic Archdiocese of Philadelphia announced that the school would move following the 2012 graduation pending funding. A new school, Lansdale Catholic Regional High School, in Hilltown Township, Bucks County, was to be built to replace the school in Lansdale. The name of the new school was voted by the students, parents and alumni. That project was cancelled because of financial reasons.

In the media
Jim Lynam started his coaching career coaching the boys' basketball team for the 1964 season.
 In 1973, Bishop Michael Joseph Bransfield was a member of the faculty.
 In 1981 they won the Boys Basketball Championship in the Bicentennial League.
 In 1998, the Lansdale Catholic football team won an ESPN ESPY Awards for "Outrageous Play of the Year", with a "Cal-Stanford" play in a game against Upper Perkiomen.

 In 2005 and 2006, the Lansdale Catholic girls' ice hockey team won the championship title. They won second place in 2003, 2004 and 2007. They have reached the championship round since they were deemed a team.
In 2008, Lansdale Catholic left the Pioneer Athletic Conference, and joined the Philadelphia Catholic League.

Notable alumni
Larry Glueck, Class of 1959 - professional American football player and coach
Tom Fazio, Class of 1962 - golf course designer
Peggy March, Class of 1966 - youngest female artist to have a number one single in the United States; she released "I Will Follow Him" in 1963, at the age of 15. (Born Margaret A. Battavio)

Timothy C. Senior, Class of 1977 - currently Roman Catholic auxiliary bishop of Philadelphia, wrote LCHS alma mater

Joe Judge, Class of 2000 - former head coach of the New York Giants

Kevin Middleton, Class of 2007 - Producer of Four Seasons Total Documentary

Sources and references

External links
Lansdale Catholic Alumni page
Picture of school
Lansdale Catholic robotics
Picture of Miss Pennsylvania, Diane-Marie Fabiano
Video of LC football play that won ESPN ESPY award
Noell Maerz tribute

Lansdale, Pennsylvania
Catholic secondary schools in Pennsylvania
Educational institutions established in 1949
Schools in Montgomery County, Pennsylvania
1949 establishments in Pennsylvania